The Tamil keyboard is used in computers and mobile devices to input text in the Tamil script.

The keyboard layout approved by the Government of Tamil Nadu is Tamil 99. The InScript keyboard is the keyboard layout standardized by the Government of India for inputting text in the languages of India written in Brahmic scripts.

Tamil keyboards are often digraphic, combining the Tamil script with the Latin alphabet.

Tamil 99

Tamil 99 is a keyboard layout approved by the Tamil Nadu Government. The layout, along with several monolingual and biliTamli
ngual fonts for use with the Tamil language, was approved by Government order on 13 June 1999.

Designed for use with a normal QWERTY keyboard, typing follows a consonant-vowel pattern. The arrangement of the characters allow for fast and simple typing for users familiar with the script.

InScript

InScript (Indian Script) is the standard keyboard for Indian scripts. It is a touch typing keyboard layout for computer. This keyboard layout is standardized by Government of India for inputting text in languages of India written in Brahmic scripts, as well as the Santali language, written in the non-Brahmic Ol Chiki script. It was developed by Indian Government and supported by several public and private organisations. This is the standard keyboard for 12 Indian scripts including Bengali, Devanagari, Gujarati, Gurmukhi, Kannada, Malayalam, Oriya, Tamil and Telugu etc.

Usage

Windows 10 
On Windows 10, Go to Settings.> Time & Language.> Region and Language.> Add new language.> Tamil (India) or Tamil (Sri Lanka) and select install. Then click Tamil (India) or Sri Lanka and select the options. Now select the Keyboard you want (Inscript or Tamil 99). Note: Tamil 99 is only available in Windows 10 April 2018 Update and higher.

iOS 
On iOS, Go to Settings.> General.>  Keyboards.> Keyboards.> Add New Keyboard, and select Tamil, Select the required keyboard, such as Tamil99, Anjal or InScript.

See also
 Tamil 99
 தமிழ் 99
 InScript
 Brahmic keyboard layouts
 Keyboard layout
 Tamil (Unicode block)

References

External links 
 http://ildc.in/inscriptlayout.html
 http://tamilelibrary.org/teli/tnstd.html
 http://tamilnation.org/digital/tamilnet99/report.htm

Tamil input methods
Keyboard layouts
Indic computing